Alexander Hermann Graf von Wartensleben (16 December 1650 in Bad Lippspringe – 26 January 1734 in Berlin) was an officer in the armies of various German states, a Prussian Generalfeldmarschall and a member of the Cabinet of Three Counts with August David zu Sayn-Wittgenstein-Hohenstein and Johann Kasimir Kolbe von Wartenberg - due to their heavy taxation, this was also known as the "three great W(oes)" of Prussia (Wartenberg, Wartensleben, Wittgenstein).

Between 1702 and 1723 he held the position of regimental chef of the 1st Prussian Infantry Regiment.

Life
He was the eldest son of Hermann Hans von Wartensleben and his wife Elisabeth von Haxthausen.  His father was lord of Güter Exten, as well as of Rinteln, Nordhold and Ottleben.  He led the Wartensleben Infantry Regiment at the Battle of Blenheim.

1709 he became lord of the manor in  Lichte (Wallendorf), Thuringian Highlands.

References

External links
 Entry in preußenchronik.de

1650 births
1734 deaths
People from Paderborn (district)
Field marshals of Prussia
Wartensleben, Alexander Hermann, Count of
Counts of Germany
Prussian politicians
Generals of the Holy Roman Empire
Military personnel from North Rhine-Westphalia